Stigmella sclerostyla is a moth of the family Nepticulidae. It is found in North America in Arkansas and Ontario.

The wingspan is 4-4.4 mm. Adults are on wing in mid-June and early July. There are possibly two generations per year.

The larvae feed on Quercus alba. They mine the leaves of their host plant. The mine is located on the upper-surface of the leaf and is long and linear, gradually increasing in width throughout its length. The frass is deposited centrally as a rather diffuse line.

External links
A taxonomic revision of the North American species of Stigmella (Lepidoptera: Nepticulidae)

Nepticulidae
Moths of North America
Moths described in 1982